This Freedom is a 1923 British silent drama film directed by Denison Clift and starring Fay Compton, Clive Brook, and John Stuart. It was based on the novel This Freedom by A.S.M. Hutchinson.

Plot
As described in a film magazine review, a woman, who learned as a child that man's power was too dominating, strikes out in search of independence. She rears a family as a business women, leaving the children to a governess. Her formula backfires and the fallacy of her ideas is the climax.

Cast

References

External links

1923 films
British drama films
British silent feature films
Films directed by Denison Clift
1923 drama films
Ideal Film Company films
British black-and-white films
1920s English-language films
1920s British films
Silent drama films